The 2012 World Wheelchair Curling Championship was held from February 18 to 25 at the Uiam Ice Rink in Chuncheon City, South Korea.

Qualification
 (host country)
Top seven teams from the 2011 World Wheelchair Curling Championship:

 (winner of the challenge games)
Two teams from the 2012 WWhCC Qualification Event

Qualification event

Slovakia and Italy qualified from the qualifying event held in November 2011 in Lohja, Finland.

Teams
The teams are listed as follows:

Round-robin standings
Final round-robin standings

Round-robin results
All times listed in Korea Standard Time (UTC+09).

Draw 1
Sunday, February 19, 9:30

Draw 2
Sunday, February 19, 15:30

Draw 3
Monday, February 20, 9:30

Draw 4
Monday, February 20, 15:30

Draw 5
Tuesday, February 21, 9:30

Draw 6
Tuesday, February 21, 15:30

Draw 7
Wednesday, February 22, 9:30

Draw 8
Wednesday, February 22, 15:30

Draw 9
Thursday, February 23, 9:00

Tiebreaker
Thursday, February 23, 14:30

Playoffs

1 vs. 2 Game
Friday, February 24, 9:30

3 vs. 4 Game
Friday, February 24, 9:30

Semifinal
Friday, February 24, 15:30

Bronze medal game
Saturday, February 25, 10:00

Gold medal game
Saturday, February 25, 14:00

References
General

Specific

World Wheelchair Curling Championship
World Wheelchair Championship
World Wheelchair Curling Championship